Hussain Abdoh Y Al-Shae'an (born 23 May 1989) is a Saudi Arabian footballer who currently plays as a goalkeeper for Al-Shabab.

References

1989 births
Living people
Sportspeople from Riyadh
Saudi Arabian footballers
Saudi Arabia international footballers
Al-Shabab FC (Riyadh) players
Ettifaq FC players
Al Hilal SFC players
Al Nassr FC players
Al-Taawoun FC players
2011 AFC Asian Cup players
Association football goalkeepers
Saudi Professional League players